John Eaton Manchester (29 January 1908 – 6 September 1983) was a New Zealand rugby union player. A flanker, Manchester played club rugby for Christchurch and represented  at a provincial level. He was a member of the New Zealand national side, the All Blacks, from 1932 to 1936, and played 36 matches—20 as captain—for the All Blacks including nine internationals. He later coached the Otago University club from 1947 to 1952, having moved to Dunedin after World War II.

Manchester died in Dunedin on 6 September 1983.

References

1908 births
1983 deaths
People from Waimate
People educated at Timaru Boys' High School
New Zealand rugby union players
New Zealand international rugby union players
Canterbury rugby union players
Rugby union flankers
New Zealand rugby union coaches